Williamsfield Township is one of the twenty-seven townships of Ashtabula County, Ohio, United States. The 2010 census found 1,645 people in the township.

Geography
Located in the southeastern corner of the county, it borders the following townships:
Andover Township - north
South Shenango Township, Crawford County, Pennsylvania - northeast
West Shenango Township, Crawford County, Pennsylvania - southeast
Kinsman Township, Trumbull County - south
Gustavus Township, Trumbull County - southwest corner
Wayne Township - west
Cherry Valley Township - northwest corner

No municipalities are located in Williamsfield Township, although the unincorporated community of Williamsfield lies in the township's center.

Name and history
Named for an early landowner, it is the only Williamsfield Township statewide.

When whites first arrived in what is now Williamsfield Township, the land was inhabited by a small number of Delaware Indians. The first white man to settle in the township was Charles Case, who came from Connecticut in 1804.

Williamsfield Township was organized in 1826. In 1833, the township contained two stores, three saw mills, and a fulling mill.

Government
The township is governed by a three-member board of trustees, who are elected in November of odd-numbered years to a four-year term beginning on the following January 1. Two are elected in the year after the presidential election and one is elected in the year before it. There is also an elected township fiscal officer, who serves a four-year term beginning on April 1 of the year after the election, which is held in November of the year before the presidential election. Vacancies in the fiscal officership or on the board of trustees are filled by the remaining trustees.  The board is currently composed of chairman Thomas Martin and members Gordon Eastlake and Thomas Lahti.

References

External links
County website

Townships in Ashtabula County, Ohio
Townships in Ohio
1826 establishments in Ohio
Populated places established in 1826